Doring Dorobo is a 1993 Philippine biographical action film co-edited and directed by Augusto Salvador. The film stars Eddie Garcia in the title role. The film is based on the life of former NBI agent Doroteo Rocha. It was one of the entries in the 1993 Metro Manila Film Festival and the final film produced by Lea Productions.

Cast
 Eddie Garcia as Doroteo "Doring" Rocha
 Eddie Gutierrez as Col. Cervantez
 Boots Anson-Roa as Dely
 Paquito Diaz as Jerry Balacundiong
 Dick Israel as Bart Pasuball
 Rey "PJ" Abellana as Rene Damian
 Vivian Foz as Letty
 Ali Sotto as Linda
 Sharmaine Arnaiz as Ali
 Ernie Zarate as NBI Director Alfredo Lim
 Mia Gutierrez as Remedios
 Robert Miller as Teddy
 Eddie Tuazon as German
 Eric Francisco as Jimmy Samodio
 Ernie David as Allan
 Joey Padilla as Pat. Meneses
 Romy Romulo as Pat. Licuanan
 Mike Vergel as David Cuartero
 Louie Katana as Mr. Wan Tan

Awards

References

External links

1993 films
Filipino-language films
Philippine biographical films
Philippine action films
Films directed by Augusto Salvador